The National Democratic Alliance (AND) is a centrist political party in Mauritania. It became the fifth largest political party of the country after the 2018 parliamentary elections. The AND backs the administration of Mohamed Ould Ghazouani and is part of the Coordination of Parties of the Majority.

History
The party was created in January 2016 after Yacoub Ould Moine, ex-MP for the Rally of Democratic Forces (RFD), left the party and applied to register a new party called "Democratic Alliance" in December 2015, although the party got its current name when registered.

The party is considered to represent the Moine family and to have been created by Ould Moine due to the refusal of Ahmed Ould Daddah, leader of the RFD, of a dialogue with the government that doesn't have previously set conditions and in order to get closer to the administration of Mohamed Ould Abdel Aziz, although the party remained first as part of a "moderate opposition".

The party emphasizes the need for national unity and "social peace of the Nation" being untouchable lines and supports strengthening the country's institutions.

Election results

National Assembly elections

References

Political parties in Mauritania